Aplanulata is a suborder of Hydrozoa, a class of marine  and freshwater invertebrates belonging to the phylum Cnidaria. The group have lost its planula larval stage, and the only remnants of the medusa stage is when they functions as gonophores attached to the polyp.

Families
According to the World Register of Marine Species, the following families are found in this suborder :

Acaulidae Fraser, 1924
Boeromedusidae Bouillon, 1995
Boreohydridae Westblad, 1947
Candelabridae Stechow, 1921
Corymorphidae Allman, 1872
Hydridae Dana, 1846
Margelopsidae Uchida, 1927
Paracorynidae Picard, 1957
Protohydridae Allman, 1888
Tubulariidae Goldfuss, 1818

References

 
Anthoathecata